Derek Chunilall Jagan (25 May 1930 – 15 October 2000) was a Guyanese politician and lawyer. He served as Speaker of the National Assembly of Guyana from 1992 to 2000. He died of an apparent heart attack while doing yard work in 2000. He was the younger brother of former Guyanese president Cheddi Jagan.

In the early 1960s, Jagan was monitored by the British government during the Cold War.

Jagan was elected (PPP/C) was elected speaker 17 December 1992. Upon his death, he was replaced by Winslow Martin Zephyr.

References 

1930 births
2000 deaths
20th-century Guyanese lawyers
Indo-Guyanese people
People from East Berbice-Corentyne
People's Progressive Party (Guyana) politicians
Speakers of the National Assembly (Guyana)